= Women Film Critics Circle =

Women Film Critics Circle Awards
- Awarded for: Excellence in cinematic achievement
- Country: United States
- First award: 2004
- Website: https://wfcc.wordpress.com/

The Women Film Critics Circle (WFCC) is a film critics and scholars association in the United States. Founded in 2004, WFCC was the first all-women group of this type in that country.

WFCC has 75 members from the United States and foreign countries who are involved in print, radio, television and online media.

== Awards ==
The Circle has made annual awards, the Women Film Critics Circle Awards, since 2004. The categories are as follows (2019):

- Best Movie About Women
- Best Movie By A Woman
- Best Woman Storytelling [a storytelling award]
- Best Actress
- Best Actor
- Best Foreign Film By or About Women
- Best Documentary By or About Women
- Best Equality of the Sexes
- Best Animated Female
- Best Screen Couple
- Adrienne Shelly Award [For a film that most passionately opposes violence against women]
- Josephine Baker Award [For best expressing the woman of color experience in America]
- Karen Morley Award [For best exemplifying a woman’s place in history or society, and a courageous search for identity]
- Acting and Activism Award
- Lifetime Achievement Award
- The Pauline Kael Special Jury Awards
  - Best Invisible Woman [supporting performance by a woman whose exceptional impact on the film dramatically, socially or historically, has been ignored]
  - Best Female Action Heroes [May be collective, or social action rather than physical action]
  - Worst Screen Mom of the Year Award
- The WFCC Hall of Shame
